Fairview is an unincorporated community in Brazos County, in the U.S. state of Texas. According to the Handbook of Texas, no population estimates were available for the community in 2000. It is located within the Bryan-College Station metropolitan area.

History
Fairview was established as a Black farming community in the 1930s and lasted for several decades. A Baptist church was established in 1945 and was built that next year. Allen Smothers was the owner of a grocery store in the mid-20th century. There were no population estimates available for the community in 2000.

Geography

Education
A school was established here in the early 1930s. Local settler Evelyn Hall named it Fairview. The school building had two rooms and operated as a daycare center. Students were then bussed to schools in Bryan. By the end of the decade, it became a community center. Today, the community is served by the College Station Independent School District.

References

Unincorporated communities in Brazos County, Texas
Unincorporated communities in Texas